
Gmina Ożarów is an urban-rural gmina (administrative district) in Opatów County, Świętokrzyskie Voivodeship, in south-central Poland.

Villages
Apart from the town of Ożarów, Gmina Ożarów contains the villages and settlements of Biedrzychów, Binkowice, Czachów, Dębno, Gliniany, Grochocice, Jakubowice, Janików, Jankowice, Janopol, Janów, Janowice, Julianów, Karsy, Kruków, Lasocin, Maruszów, Niemcówka, Nowe, Pisary, Polesie Mikułowskie, Potok, Potok-Kolonia, Prusy, Przybysławice, Śmiłów, Sobótka, Sobów, Śródborze, Stróża, Suchodółka, Szymanówka, Tominy, Wlonice, Wojciechówka, Wólka Chrapanowska, Wyszmontów and Zawada.

Neighbouring gminas
Gmina Ożarów is bordered by the gminas of Annopol, Ćmielów, Dwikozy, Tarłów, Wilczyce, Wojciechowice and Zawichost.

References
 Polish official population figures 2006

Ozarow
Opatów County